Đorđe Okuka (born 20 June 1996 in Višegrad) is a Bosnian-Herzegovinian professional footballer who plays as a winger for Second League of RS (Group East) club FK Sutjeska Foča.

Club career
Okuka started his career with FK Drina HE Višegrad in 2016. In 2018, he left Drina and joined First League of the Republika Srpska club FK Sutjeska Foča. Currently he is one of the most talented players at Sutjeska and is a big prospect. He played a cup game for Alfa Modriča in 2019.

Personal life
Đorđe Okuka has family relation with notable Serbian football coach Dragan Okuka.

References

1996 births
Living people
People from Višegrad
Association football wingers
Bosnia and Herzegovina footballers
Bosnia and Herzegovina youth international footballers
Bosnia and Herzegovina under-21 international footballers
FK Sutjeska Foča players
FK Modriča players
First League of the Republika Srpska players